Trump is a surname of English and German origin:
a German surname, possibly from a word for "drum". It is notable as the surname of Donald Trump who was president of the United States from 2017 to 2021. It has an older presence in the United States via the 18th-century Amish migration from the Palatinate to Pennsylvania.
an English surname derived from Old French trompeor "trumpeter" or "maker of trumpets" (modern surnames Trump and Trumper), recorded from the 1270s.

The majority of people with the surname live in the United States (close to 5,000 individuals, approximately 900 of whom live in Pennsylvania); the surname does survive in both Germany and England, but is comparatively rare (fewer than 500 individuals in each country).

German surname
German name researcher (Lehrbeauftragter für Namenforschung) Hans Bahlow derived the German surname Trump from a Bavarian word for "drum" (Middle High German trumpe). The name is on record since the early modern period, with immigration to colonial North America from the 1730s.

Trump as a contemporary German surname is comparatively rare, with 382 telephone book entries as of 2016 concentrated in the Cologne area, the Bad Dürkheim district, the Gifhorn district, and the Schwäbisch Hall/Ansbach region.

 Georg Trump (1896–1985), German graphic, typeface, and postage stamp designer
 Peter Trump (born 1950), German field hockey player
 Walter Trump, German mathematician

The German surname was introduced to the British colonial Province of Pennsylvania in 1733.
Philip Thomas Trump was recorded as part of a group of Germans from the Palatinate.
In the United States, there were close to 4,800 individuals with the surname on record as of 2016, Pennsylvania still accounting for close to one fifth of their number.

 Charles S. Trump (born 1960), West Virginia State Senator
 Chrystelle Bond (1938–2020), American dancer, choreographer, and dance historian
 Clifford Trump (born 1937), president of Idaho State University
 Donald J. Trump, (born 1946), real estate developer, reality-TV and social media personality, 45th president of the United States from 2017–2021 
 Donald L. Trump (born 1945), American oncologist
 Mary Lea Trump (born 1965), American clinical psychologist, author, podcaster
 William Trump (1923–2009), American soldier

English surname
The modern English surnames Trump, Tromp, and Trumper are derived from occupational names referring to "trumpet", either for trumpeters or trumpet-makers. 
Early attestations of the occupational name include references to one Patrick Trumpe in Cumbria (1275), to Adam Trumpur in Essex (also 1275), and to Nicholas Trump in Cambridgeshire (1279).
One William Trompeur is recorded in London in 1320, and one John le Trumpour in Yorkshire in 1327. 
One of the Monmouth rebels transported to the West Indies in 1685 was Humphrey Trump of Membury, Devon.
In modern English surnames Trump is localized in Southwestern England, especially Devon and Somerset.
429 individuals named Trump were reported for Great Britain as of 2016 (compared to 458 in 1881).

 David H. Trump (1931–2016), British archaeologist known for his work in the area of Maltese prehistory
 Dorothy Trump (1964–2013), English geneticist
 Gerald Trump (born 1937), English cricketer
 Harvey Trump (born 1968), English cricketer
 Judd Trump (born 1989), English snooker player

See also
 Anita Trumpe (born 1968), Latvian hurdler
 Drumpf (surname)
 Tromp (surname)
 Van Trump (surname)

References

Donald Trump
English-language surnames
German-language surnames
Occupational surnames
English-language occupational surnames